Kalloori is a 2007 Indian Tamil-language coming-of-age drama film by director Balaji Sakthivel. The movie was produced by S. Shankar's banner S Pictures. The story, based on a college campus, featuring debutants Akhil, Tamannaah, and Bharani alongside an ensemble cast including Hemalatha, Maya Reddy, Rajeshwari, Sailatha, Prakaash, Kamakshinathan, and Thisaigal Arunkumar. The music was scored by Joshua Sridhar, and lyrics were written by Na. Muthukumar.

The film was released on 7 December 2007, received positive reviews from the critics as well as audience and become a blockbuster.

The film was inspired on a real-life incident of three college girls of the Tamil Nadu Agricultural University being burnt alive in the 2000 Dharmapuri bus burning incident.

Plot 

The film begins with a group of students clearing weeds near a roadside tree.

The scene flashes back a few years earlier in a bus with a lot of college students heading towards Government Arts College in a small town. A set of people – Muthuchelvan, Ramesh, Kayalvizhi, Adhilakshmi, Nagarani, Albert, Kamakshinathan, Salima, Ayyanar – are introduced as friends since high school. Muthu is a well-talented athlete. Ramesh is a big flirt and movie buff. Kayal is a strong-willed and courageous woman who hates the idea of falling in love within friends. Adhilakshmi is a food lover. Nagarani is a Telugu-speaking girl who gets fits when she is frightened. Albert is a Christian who always gets abused by his drunkard father. Kamakshinathan is a rich yet timid person who gets very shy to introduce himself to his classmates at the first day of college. Salima is a Muslim girl who is both intelligent in studies and talented in dance. Ayyanar is a quirky guy. All are studying in the same class. They enter into the college for the first time. In the classroom, they see a beautiful girl named Shobhana, who is strikingly different. She looks depressed and aloof. The friends are puzzled by her in the beginning, and they later learn that she recently lost her mother in an accident. The group sympathizes for her and brings her into their fold. Shobhana soon becomes a member of their group and ditches her plans to pursue her course in Delhi simply to be with these friends during college.

The movie goes on to narrate the college life with fun and colour. It shows the strength of the friendship and the backgrounds of the friends; most of them are from poor families. Muthu has an aim in his life. Being an athlete, he wants to excel in sports and get a good job through the sports quota to give his poor family a new lease of life. Shobhana, who is from a wealthy family background, feels sympathy for Muthu after she sees the conditions that he and his family live in. She is moved by his perseverance and helps him achieve his goal by encouraging him in every chance. She even advises him that there is more he has to do and be capable of achieving in life, so he should take her encouragements as a way to improve his career and nothing else. But eventually, her encouraging stance turns into some sort of special attachment with him. Slowly, love develops in the minds of both, but they chose to put it on the back seat for the sake of the larger friendship that they share with the group.

Eventually, the friends take a college trip to Andhra. On the way, they stop at a hotel, but there is only non-vegetarian food being served, so Muthu volunteers to run to the nearest vegetarian restaurant a few kilometers away to bring food for Shobhana, who is a vegetarian. Shobhana confessed her love for Muthu to Kayal, which she accepts it wholeheartedly and says that even though she hates the concept of love between best friends, she does not want to spoil Shobhana's happiness and true love. This conversation was overheard by Adhilakshmi. The latter says this to the rest of the gang, to their surprise and delight. Unfortunately, fate has other plans. The hotel they were initially eating at is urgently closed because some politician or another has been arrested.  The group boards the bus urgently and tries to go to a collector's office or police station to keep safe while two classmates wait for Muthu to come back. On the way, however, the bus is stopped by the protestors, and despite pleas to allow them to pass, the protestors light the bus on fire. In a frenzy, everyone tries to evacuate the bus, and Nagarani gets fits. In a scramble to safely get off the bus, the rest of the group fail to realize that some students are still trapped. After the firefighters finish putting out the fire, they bring out the burnt bodies of Kayal, Adhilakshmi and Shobhana, who have embraced each other in their final moments together – Kayal having stayed back to help Shobhana, whose chudi had gotten caught in the bus.

The last scene flashes back to the beginning of the movie, where the group of people were clearing the weeds. It has been eight years since the incident, and every year, the group of friends come to pay respects to their lost friends, and Muthu still keeps  Shobhana's handkerchief in remembrance of their love.

Cast 

Akhil as Muthuchelvan
Tamannaah as Shobana
Bharani as Ramesh
Hemalatha as Kayalvizhi
Maya Reddy as Saleema
Sailatha as Nagarani
Prakaash as Albert
Kamakshinathan as Kamakshinathan
Rajeswari as Adhilakshmi
Thisaigal Arunkumar as Ayyanar
Mohamed Mufak as Karthi
Balamurugan
Arunkumar
Alex
Vinoth as Iruvar
Sivakumar as Lecturer
Usha Elizabeth as Lecturer

Soundtrack 

Behindwoods stated that Joshua Sridhar's style evoked the period of the film and said that Na. Muthukumar's lyrics evoked a nostalgic feeling.

Release and reception 
Behindwoods stated that the film works but its lack of action and dance numbers might affect its prospects at the box office. IndiaGlitz said out that the climax scene was credibly portrayed but did not fit well into the script. Deccan Herald wrote, "The director, casting many newcomers, has elicited the best from them. Their performances can astound even the best of actors in Tamil cinema. Tamanna could have done a better job though".

After the film's release, Sakthivel changed the climax because of negative reactions to a scene which was reminiscent of a real-life incident where girls were burned on a bus.

References

External links 

2000s Tamil-language films
2007 films
Films directed by Balaji Sakthivel
Films scored by Joshua Sridhar
Films shot in Andhra Pradesh
Indian coming-of-age films
Indian films based on actual events